Joseph Oliver "Jocko" Cunningham (born October 30, 1950) is a former racing driver who competed in the SCCA/ECAR Formula Atlantic series from 1986 to 1990. He finished second in the championship in 1988 and won the championship in 1989. Among his 7 race victories was the series' first oval race on the Milwaukee Mile in 1988. His last season in the series was 1990. He currently resides in Harbor Springs, Michigan.

References
Racing Years

1950 births
American racing drivers
Atlantic Championship drivers
Living people
People from Harbor Springs, Michigan
Racing drivers from California
Racing drivers from San Diego
Sportspeople from San Diego